Neuropeptide Y receptor type 2 (Y2R) is a member of the neuropeptide Y receptor family of G-protein coupled receptors, that in humans is encoded by the NPY2R gene.

Selective ligands

Agonists 
 Neuropeptide Y (endogenous agonist, non subtype selective)
 Neuropeptide Y fragment 13-36 (NPY2 selective agonist)
 Peptide YY
 Peptide YY 3-36 fragment

Antagonists 
 BIIE-0246 (CAS# 246146-55-4)
 JNJ 5207787 (CAS# 683746-68-1)
 SF 11 (CAS# 443292-81-7)

See also 
 Neuropeptide Y receptor

References

External links

Further reading 

 
 
 
 
 
 
 
 
 
 
 
 
 
 
 
 

G protein-coupled receptors